Goharabad is a village in Diamer district, Gilgit-Baltistan, in Pakistan.  It is famous for its valley.

Goharabad Valley 
Goharabad's valley is one of the most famous parts of Diamer district.  Many tourists often visit the valley and hike up and meet the local people.

Literacy Rate 
There is only one school in Goharabad called Boys Middle School and it did not become a high school.  Most kids study in Chilas, Gilgit, Abbottabad, or Islamabad.  The school for girls is in bad shape even though it only opened in 2009.

Dam 
There is currently a dam being constructed in Goharabad called Diamer-Bhasha Dam.

References 

Populated places in Diamer District